The first elections to East Ayrshire Council were held on 6 April 1995, on the same day as the 28 other Scottish local government elections. The council was created from the former Cumnock and Doon Valley and Kilmarnock and Loudoun district councils and assumed some of the responsibilities of the former Strathclyde Regional Council following the implementation of the Local Government etc. (Scotland) Act 1994.

The election was the first since the Second Statutory Reviews of Electoral Arrangements which was initially meant to decide boundaries for the district and regional councils. After the district councils were abolished by the Local Government etc. (Scotland) Act 1994, the review was instead used to decide boundaries for the newly created unitary authority. As a result, there remained 10 seats covering the former Cumnock and Doon Valley District and 20 seats were established for the former Kilmarnock and Loudoun District, two more than had been in use since the Initial Statutory Reviews of Electoral Arrangements in 1981.

Labour took control of the council after winning 22 of the 30 seats. The other eight seats were won by the Scottish National Party (SNP).

Summary

Source:

Ward results

Ward 1

Ward 2

Ward 3

Ward 4

Ward 5

Ward 6

Ward 7

Ward 8

Ward 9

Ward 10

Ward 11

Ward 12

Ward 13

Ward 14

Ward 15

Ward 16

Ward 17

Ward 18

Ward 19

Ward 20

Cumnock East

Lugar, Logan and Muirkirk

Cumnock South and Old Cumnock

Cumnock West and Auchinleck

Catrine, Sorn and North Auchinleck

New Cumnock

Dalmellington

Patna and Dalrymple

Drongan, Ochiltree, Rankinston and Stair

Mauchline

Notes

References

East Ayrshire
East Ayrshire Council elections